Satanfah Sor.Prateep (สะท้านฟ้า ส.ประทีป) is a retired Thai Muay Thai fighter who fought in the 1970s and early 1980s. He was a Rajadamnern Stadium and Lumpinee Stadium Champion with notable wins over Apidej SitHirun, Sirimongkol Luksiripat, Neth Saknarong, Buriram Suanmiskawan, Sorasak Sor.Lukbuklo, Khunpon Sakornpitak, Igari Genshuu, and Huasai Sittiboonlert.

Career and biography 
Satanfah came from a small village in Trakan Phuet Phon District, Ubon Ratchathani. He was the fourth child out of ten siblings. He would be the first in his family to start boxing and three of his brothers later joined him.

Satanfah started boxing under Ajarn Wanlop Ketsena, the head of the Senapitak boxing camp in his home district. He would have his first fight in 1968, at 14 years old, under the ring name Praisatan Senapitak. He would win this fight after which he received 45 baht. He went on to win 15 more consecutive fights in Ubon Ratchathani.

As he was also studying in school at the time, he wanted to lighten the financial load of his parents, so he also became a Tuk-Tuk Taxi driver.

After he graduated from Ubon Ratchathani Technical College at Vocational level, Satanfah made his way to Bangkok where he started living with Mr. Sakorn Prathanaprateep, the head of Sor.Prateep boxing camp, where he would change his name to Satanfah Sor.Prateep and started fighting at Rajadamnern Stadium and Lumpinee Stadium.

Satanfah famously won five titles in his career, four in Muay Thai, and the last, a national title in Boxing.

His first title, the Light welterweight (140 lbs) Rajadamnern Stadium title was acquired in Japan in 1974 against Sorasak Sor.Lukbuklo, the nephew of the legendary Suk Prasarthinpimai. Sorasak had initially won the title against Prayuth Suparak, then beat Saensak Muangsurin but lost it soon after in the rematch as Saensak won via first round knockout. He later won the vacant title against Buriram Suanmiskawan and then lost it to Satanfah.

His second was the Welterweight (147 lbs) Rajadamnern Stadium title, which he won in 1975 against Khunpon Sakornpitak, who had notable wins against the legendary Vicharnnoi Porntawee.

In 1977, despite spending most of his time fighting in Lumpinee Stadium up to this point, Satanfah was given yet another Rajadamnern Stadium title shot, which he won against Tongtha Kiatwayupak.

In April 1978, just one month after Japanese Muay Thai legend Toshio Fujiwara had beaten Mongsawan Rukchiangmai in Japan to become the first foreigner ever to win the Rajadamnern Stadium title, Satanfah was to face former rival and Japanese Kickboxing legend Igari Genshuu, this time for the Lumpinee Stadium Middleweight title. Genshuu had knocked out Satanfah two years earlier to the shock of the audience at Lumpinee Stadium. Satanfah successfully took his revenge and won the title by decision.

Though he did win many titles, he never defended a single one because it was very hard to find opponents for his weight classes. Between 1977 and 1980, Satanfah was considered the best "heavyweight" as that was what the 160 lbs division (Middleweight) was called in Thailand at the time.

Satanfah fought in Muay Thai up until 1980, when he made the switch to boxing, where he initially had success, winning three in a row and the national Boxing title at 160 lbs against Mana Premchai. He then fought three times in South Korea, against two OPBF Champions, and WBA World Champion In-Chul Baek.

He retired from fighting in 1983, at 31 years old after his last loss in Boxing.

Titles

Muay Thai 
Rajadamnern Stadium

 1974 Rajadamnern Stadium Light welterweight (140 lbs) Champion
 1975 Rajadamnern Stadium Welterweight (147 lbs) Champion
 1977 Rajadamnern Stadium Middleweight (160 lbs) Champion

Lumpinee Stadium

 1978 Lumpinee Stadium Middleweight (160 lbs) Champion

Fight record 

|- style="text-align:center; background:#cfc;"
|1979-12-01
|Win
| align="left" | Pongdetnoi Prasopchai
|Lumpinee Stadium
|Bangkok, Thailand
|Decision
|5
|3:00
|- style="text-align:center; background:#cfc;"
|1979-10-08
|Win
| align="left" | Karawe Kwanchaichonabot
|Lumpinee Stadium
|Bangkok, Thailand
|Decision
|5
|3:00

|- style="text-align:center; background:#c5d2ea;"
|1979-01-23
|Draw
| align="left" | Poot Lorlek
|Ubon Ratchathani Boxing Stadium
|Ubon Ratchathani, Thailand
|Decision
|5
|3:00

|- style="text-align:center; background:#cfc;"
|1978-09-30
|Win
| align="left" | Neth Saknarong
|Lumpinee Stadium
|Bangkok, Thailand
|TKO
|2
|
|- style="text-align:center; background:#cfc;"
|1978-08-18
|Win
| align="left" | Faisal Karakuş
|Holland vs Thailand, Lumpinee Stadium
|Bangkok, Thailand
|KO
|2
|
|- style="text-align:center; background:#cfc;"
|1978-07-04
|Win
| align="left" | David Anmonrat
|Lumpinee Stadium
|Bangkok, Thailand
|Decision
|5
|3:00
|- style="text-align:center; background:#cfc;"
|1978-04-07
|Win
| align="left" | Genshuu Igari
|Lumpinee Stadium
|Bangkok, Thailand
|Decision
|5
|3:00
|-
! colspan="8" style="background:white" |
|- style="text-align:center; background:#cfc;"
|1977
|Win
| align="left" | Tongtha Kiatiwayupak
|Rajadamnern Stadium
|Bangkok, Thailand
|Decision
|5
|3:00
|-
! colspan="8" style="background:white" |

|- style="text-align:center; background:#cfc;"
|1976-05-27
|Win
| align="left" | Pongdejnoi Prasopchai
|Rajadamnern Stadium
|Bangkok, Thailand
|Decision
|5
|3:00
|-
! colspan="8" style="background:white" |

|- style="text-align:center; background:#cfc;"
|1976-04-23
|Win
| align="left" | Sirimongkol Luksiripat
|Lumpinee Stadium
|Bangkok, Thailand
|Decision
|5
|3:00

|- style="text-align:center; background:#fbb;"
|1976-02-03
|Loss
| align="left" | Genshuu Igari
|Lumpinee Stadium
|Bangkok, Thailand
|KO
|3
|

|- style="text-align:center; background:#cfc;"
|1975-12-05
|Win
| align="left" | Prayut Sithiboonlert
|
|Bangkok, Thailand
|KO
|3
|

|- style="text-align:center; background:#fbb;"
|1975-09-12
|Loss
| align="left" | Poot Lorlek
|Lumpinee Stadium
|Bangkok, Thailand
|Decision
|5
|3:00
|- style="text-align:center; background:#cfc;"
|1975-06-02
|Win
| align="left" | Khunpon Sakornpitak
|Rajadamnern Stadium
|Bangkok, Thailand
|Decision
|5
|3:00
|-
! colspan="8" style="background:white" |

|- style="text-align:center; background:#cfc;"
|1975-04-07
|Win
| align="left" | Apidej SitHirun
|Rajadamnern Stadium
|Bangkok, Thailand
|Decision
|5
|3:00
|- style="text-align:center; background:#fbb;"
|1975-02-11
|Loss
| align="left" | Pichit Singchuekplerng
|Huamark Stadium
|Bangkok, Thailand
|Decision
|5
|3:00
|- style="text-align:center; background:#fbb;"
|1975-01-14
|Loss
| align="left" | Poot Lorlek
|Lumpinee Stadium
|Bangkok, Thailand
|Decision
|5
|3:00
|- style="text-align:center; background:#cfc;"
|1974-11-30
|Win
| align="left" | Sorasak Sor.Lukbuklo
|
|Japan
|KO
|3
|
|-
! colspan="8" style="background:white" |

|- style="text-align:center; background:#cfc;"
|1974-10-08
|Win
| align="left" | Karawe Kwanchaichonabot
|Lumpinee Stadium
|Bangkok, Thailand
|KO
|2
|
|- style="text-align:center; background:#cfc;"
|1974-09-26
|Win
| align="left" | Buriram Suanmiskawan
|Lumpinee Stadium
|Bangkok, Thailand
|KO
|3
|
|- style="text-align:center; background:#fbb;"
|1974-07-12
|Loss
| align="left" | Prayuth Sittiboonlert
|Lumpinee Stadium
|Bangkok, Thailand
|Decision
|5
|3:00
|- style="text-align:center; background:#cfc;"
|1974-06-17
|Win
| align="left" | Huasai Sittiboonlert
|Lumpinee Stadium
|Bangkok, Thailand
|KO
|3
|
|- style="text-align:center; background:#cfc;"
|1974-05-17
|Win
| align="left" | Trang Sitpongchai
|Lumpinee Stadium
|Bangkok, Thailand
|KO
|3
|
|- style="text-align:center; background:#cfc;"
|1974-04-16
|Win
| align="left" | Sorasak Sor.Lukbuklo
|Lumpinee Stadium
|Bangkok, Thailand
|Decision
|5
|3:00
|- style="text-align:center; background:#fbb;"
|1974-03-09
|Loss
| align="left" | Chatpraset Rungrit
|
|Ubon Ratchathani, Thailand
|Decision
|5
|3:00
|- style="text-align:center; background:#cfc;"
|1974-01-15
|Win
| align="left" | Kraila Silatong
|Lumpinee Stadium
|Bangkok, Thailand
|Decision
|5
|3:00

|-
| colspan=8 | Legend:

References 

1952 births
Satanfah Sor.Prateep
Middleweight kickboxers
Living people
Satanfah Sor.Prateep